Gamasellus nivalis is a species of mite in the family Ologamasidae.

References

nivalis
Articles created by Qbugbot
Animals described in 1949